Yogaville, or Satchidananda Ashram, is the Buckingham County, Virginia headquarters of Satchidananda Saraswati's organisation.

Ashram  

The ashram was founded in 1980 by Satchidananda Saraswati, whose western notability stems from his opening of the Woodstock festival. The ashram is the international organizational headquarters of Swami Satchidananda's documented teachings. It is located in Buckingham County, Virginia. The primary goal of guru Yogiraj Sri Swami Satchidananda (1914-2002) was interfaith understanding as a vehicle to world peace. To this end, the LOTUS (Light Of Truth Universal Shrine) was constructed and inaugurated in 1986. Swami Satchidananda had been living in Yogaville, though he was visiting Madras, in South India at the time of his death.

The property in rural Virginia, along the James River, was identified for the community from the air as the swami flew over, looking for land farther south than his ashram in Pomfret, Connecticut. Swami Satchidananda acquired 600 acres in 1979 to form his town, financing it by selling property in Falls Village, Connecticut that had been given to him by Carole King. As of 1986, when the LOTUS was dedicated, around 120 people were living on a total of 750 acres. Reports cited plans to eventually house a population between 600 and 1,000. The ashram in Yogaville maintains a large kitchen and dining room for residents and guests. A 1996 book of favorite ashram recipes has had nine editions. According to the official website, there are around 200 residents as of 2015. 
In addition to the Virginia and Connecticut ashrams, Yogaville-West was founded in Seigler Springs, California in 1972.

LOTUS 

Costing $2 million (financed through donations and tithes) and dedicated on July 20, 1986, the shrine is the centerpiece of Yogaville. The structure is shaped like a lotus flower, features a gold-leaf dome, and houses 12 altars representing Christian, Jewish, Hindu, Shinto, Tao, Buddhist, Islam, Sikh, Native American, and African religions. Blue neon tubes extend from each altar up along the spines of the vaulted ceiling.

Notable residents 

 Rivers Cuomo
 Doc Antle

References

External links
 

Neighborhoods in Virginia
Religious organizations established in 1980
Buckingham County, Virginia
Swami Satchidananda Saraswati
1980 establishments in Virginia
Buildings and structures in Buckingham County, Virginia
Hinduism in the United States
Religious buildings and structures completed in 1980
Indian-American culture in Virginia
Asian-American culture in Virginia